Aleksei Fokin (born 29 August 1997) is a Russian handball player for HBC CSKA Moscow and the Russian national team.

He represented Russia at the 2019 World Men's Handball Championship.

References

1997 births
Living people
Russian male handball players